was a Japanese footballer. A Japanese international, he spent his entire career with Mitsubishi Motors.

Club career
Taguchi was born in Akita on February 14, 1955. After graduating from high school, he joined Mitsubishi Motors in 1973. In 1973, the club won the champions at Japan Soccer League and Emperor's Cup. In 1975, he debuted as a starting goalkeeper for Japan national team, replacing established starter Kenzo Yokoyama.

In 1978, he was part of one of the club's most successful seasons, winning the Japanese treble; Japan Soccer League, JSL Cup and Emperor's Cup. The club also won 1980 Emperor's Cup, 1981 JSL Cup and 1982 Japan Soccer League. He retired in 1984. He played 161 games in the league. He was selected Best Eleven 8 times included for 7 years in a row (1977-1983).

National team career
On September 8, 1975, Taguchi debuted for Japan national team against South Korea. In 1977, he became a regular goalkeeper and played at 1978 World Cup qualification, 1978 Asian Games and 1980 Summer Olympics qualification. From 1982, he became a captain and played at 1982 Asian Games and 1984 Summer Olympics qualification. He played 59 games for Japan until 1984.

Coaching career

On November 12, 2019, Taguchi died of respiratory failure in Tokyo at the age of 64.

Club statistics

National team statistics

References

External links
 
 Japan National Football Team Database

1955 births
2019 deaths
Association football people from Akita Prefecture
People from Akita (city)
Japanese footballers
Japan international footballers
Japan Soccer League players
Urawa Red Diamonds players
Footballers at the 1978 Asian Games
Footballers at the 1982 Asian Games
Association football goalkeepers
Asian Games competitors for Japan